FC Legion Makhachkala is a Russian football team from Makhachkala. It was founded in 2015 as FC Legion Makhachkala and participated in local amateur competitions. Before the 2016–17 season, it was renamed to Legion-Dynamo and licensed to play in the third-tier Russian Professional Football League. As FC Dynamo Makhachkala was resurrected, the team was renamed back to FC Legion Makhachkala in July 2022.

Current squad
As of 22 February 2023, according to the Second League website.

References

External links
  Official Website
 

Association football clubs established in 2015
Football clubs in Russia
Sport in Makhachkala
2015 establishments in Russia